Keeping up with the Joneses is an idiom in many parts of the English-speaking world referring to the comparison to one's neighbor as a benchmark for social class or the accumulation of material goods. To fail to "keep up with the Joneses" is perceived as demonstrating socio-economic or cultural inferiority. The phrase originated in a comic strip of the same name.

Origins

The phrase originates with the comic strip Keeping Up with the Joneses, created by Arthur R. "Pop" Momand in 1913. The strip ran until 1940 in The New York World and various other newspapers. The strip depicts the social climbing McGinis family, who struggle to "keep up" with their neighbors, the Joneses of the title. The Joneses were unseen characters throughout the strip's run, often spoken of but never shown. The idiom keeping up with the Joneses has remained popular long after the strip's end.

The use of the name Jones to refer to metaphorical neighbors or friends in discussions of social comparison predates Momand's comic strip. In 1879, English writer E. J. Simmons wrote in Memoirs of a Station Master of the railroad station as a place for social exchange: "The Joneses, who don't associate with the Robinsons, meet there." American humorist Mark Twain made an allusion to Smith and Jones families with regard to social custom in the essay "Corn Pone Opinions", written in 1901 but first published in 1923. "The outside influences are always pouring in upon us, and we are always obeying their orders and accepting their verdicts. The Smiths like the new play; the Joneses go to see it, and they copy the Smith verdict." Starting in 1908, D.W. Griffith directed a series of comedy shorts starring The Biograph Girl, Florence Lawrence, featuring the people next door, The Joneses.

An alternative explanation is that the Joneses of the saying refer to the wealthy family of Edith Wharton's father, the Joneses. The Joneses were a prominent New York family with substantial interests in Chemical Bank as a result of marrying the daughters of the bank's founder, John Mason. The Joneses and other rich New Yorkers began to build country villas in the Hudson Valley around Rhinecliff and Rhinebeck, which had belonged to the Livingstons, another prominent New York family to whom the Joneses were related. The houses became grander and grander. In 1853, Elizabeth Schermerhorn Jones built a 24-room gothic villa called Wyndcliffe described by Henry Winthrop Sargent in 1859 as being very fine in the style of a Scottish castle, but by Edith Wharton, Elizabeth's niece, as a gloomy monstrosity. The villa reportedly spurred more building, including a house by William B. Astor (married to a Jones cousin), a phenomenon later described as "keeping up with the Joneses". The phrase is also associated with another of Edith Wharton's aunts, Mary Mason Jones, who built a large mansion at Fifth Avenue and 57th Street, then undeveloped. Wharton portrays her affectionately in The Age of Innocence as Mrs. Manson Mingott, "calmly waiting for fashion to flow north".

A slightly different version is that the phrase refers to the grand lifestyle of the Joneses who by the mid-century were numerous and wealthy, thanks to the Chemical Bank and Mason connection. It was their relation Mrs William Backhouse Astor, Jr who began the "patriarchs balls", the origin of "The Four Hundred", the list of the society elite who were invited. By then the Joneses were being eclipsed by the massive wealth of the Astors, Vanderbilts and others but the four hundred list published in 1892 contained many of the Joneses and their relations—old money still mattered.

Social effects
The philosophy of "keeping up with the Joneses" has widespread effects on some societies. According to this philosophy, conspicuous consumption occurs when people care about their standard of living and its appearance in relation to their peers.

According to Roger Mason, "the demand for status goods, fueled by conspicuous consumption, has diverted many resources away from investment in the manufacture of more material goods and services in order to satisfy consumer preoccupations with their relative social standing and prestige".

Social status once depended on one's family name; however,  social mobility in the United States and the rise of consumerism there both gave rise to change. With the increasing availability of goods, people became more inclined to define themselves by what they possessed and the quest for higher status accelerated. Conspicuous consumption and materialism have been an insatiable juggernaut ever since.

Inability to "keep up with the Joneses" might result in dissatisfaction, even for people whose status is high. This could possibly tie in to a concept/theory called the “hedonic treadmill.”

Economics and pursuing social status overlap for some where “keeping up with the Joneses“ results in "living above one's means".  One ostensible indicator of this is credit card debt - though that is a gross measure and does not take into account such factors as increasing individual incomes, declining interest rates, changes in laws and or credit policies, and attractive investment opportunities that may capture an individual‘s cash, who then relies on credit cards more heavily for basic living expenses.

In popular culture
In the 1936 book The Next 100 Years, Clifford C. Furnas writes that the phenomenon of Keeping up with the Joneses' ... is descended from the spreading of the peacock's tail."

In the United Kingdom, when Princess Margaret married the fashionable photographer Anthony Armstrong-Jones in 1960, Wallis Simpson allegedly said: "At least we're keeping up with the Armstrong-Joneses".

Jones in the Fast Lane is a life simulation videogame developed and published by Sierra Entertainment in 1990. The game's name and goals are a play on the concept of keeping up with the Joneses.

The Temptations recorded the song "Don't Let The Joneses Get You Down" on their 1969 album Puzzle People. The phrase is also referenced in the 1977 song "Luckenbach, Texas (Back to the Basics of Love)" by Waylon Jennings. The Canadian band Spirit of the West referenced the phrase in a song about disability in society with the title "(Putting Up With) The Joneses" on the 1990 album Save This House. The phrase is a line of the lyrics of the song "Life At The Top" by the band Bad English, included in their 1991 album Backlash. The phrase appears in the song "I Wanna Go Back" by Christian singer David Dunn on his 2017 album "Yellow Balloons".

The phrase is used as the title of a 2011–2014 Barbadian comedy-series and also a 2016 American film Keeping Up with the Joneses. The reality television show Keeping Up with the Kardashians takes it name from this phrase, replacing "Joneses" with "Kardashians".

The drum line of the Santa Clara Vanguard Drum and Bugle Corps is referred to as "Jonz" with the same intent...that all other drums lines need to keep up with their performance and innovation.

See also

 Affluenza
 Anthropological theories of value
 Conspicuous consumption
 Fear of missing out
 Generation Jones
 Herd behavior
 The Joneses
 Keeping Up with the Joneses
 Keeping up with the Kardashians
 Mimesis
 Relative deprivation
 Status Anxiety
 Symbolic capital
 Transformative asset
 Veblen good
 Diderot effect

References

American English idioms
Social status
Socio-economic mobility
Quotations from comics
1910s neologisms